Gymnomma nitidiventris is a species of tachinid flies in the genus Gymnomma of the family Tachinidae.

References

Tachinidae
Insects described in 1888